Eurystyles is a genus of flowering plants from the orchid family, Orchidaceae. It contains 20 known species native to South America, Central America, the West Indies and Chiapas.

Eurystyles actinosophila (Barb.Rodr.) Schltr.
Eurystyles alticola Dod
Eurystyles ananassocomus (Rchb.f.) Schltr.
Eurystyles borealis A.H.Heller
Eurystyles christensonii D.E.Benn.
Eurystyles cogniauxii (Kraenzl.) Schltr.
Eurystyles cornu-bovis Szlach.
Eurystyles cotyledon Wawra
Eurystyles cristata (Schltr.) Schltr.
Eurystyles crocodilus Szlach.
Eurystyles domingensis Dod
Eurystyles gardneri (Lindl.) Garay
Eurystyles guentheriana (Kraenzl.) Garay
Eurystyles hoehnei Szlach.
Eurystyles lobata Chiron & V.P.Castro
Eurystyles lorenzii (Cogn.) Schltr.
Eurystyles ochyrana (Szlach., Mytnik & Rutk.) F.Barros & L.R.S.Guim.
Eurystyles rutkowskiana Szlach.
Eurystyles splendissima Szlach.
Eurystyles standleyi Ames

See also 
 List of Orchidaceae genera

References 

  (1863) Oesterreichische Botanische Zeitschrift 13(1): 223.
  (2003) Genera Orchidacearum 3: 204 ff. Oxford University Press.
  2005. Handbuch der Orchideen-Namen. Dictionary of Orchid Names. Dizionario dei nomi delle orchidee. Ulmer, Stuttgart
  (2011) The leaves got it right again: DNA phylogenetics supports a sister-group relationship between Eurostlyes and Lankesterella (Orchidaceae: Spiranthinae), Lankesteriana, 11(3): 337–347.

External links 

Cranichideae genera
Spiranthinae